Nolan Helmets SpA is an Italian motorcycle helmet firm founded in 1972 by Lander Nocchi, an entrepreneur in the motorcycle and car accessory sectors.

Nolan manufactures all components to their helmets in-house. Nolan also manufactures the X-Lite helmet brand, as well as the Grex value line of helmets for new riders.

Motorcycle racers Casey Stoner and Marco Melandri have used Nolan helmets over their careers.
In the past, other important motorcycle racers like Ricardo Tormo used Nolan helmets too.

References

External links 

 

Automotive companies of Italy
Motorcycle helmet manufacturers
Sporting goods manufacturers of Italy
Italian brands
Manufacturing companies established in 1972
Italian companies established in 1972